KSSQ may refer to:

 KSSQ-LP, a radio station (102.3 FM) licensed to Siloam Springs, Arkansas, United States
 The ICAO code for Shell Lake Municipal Airport at Shell Lake, in Washburn County, Wisconsin, United States